The 1990 Big South Conference men's basketball tournament took place March 1–3, 1990, at the Winthrop Coliseum in Rock Hill, South Carolina. For the first time in their school history, the Coastal Carolina Chanticleers won the tournament, led by head coach Russ Bergman.

Format
All of the conference's seven members participated in the tournament, hosted at the Winthrop Coliseum, home of the Winthrop Eagles. Teams were seeded by conference winning percentage.

Bracket

* Asterisk indicates overtime game
Source

All-Tournament Team
Milton Moore, UNC Asheville
Robert Dowdell, Coastal Carolina
Eddie Lesaine, Coastal Carolina
Tony Dunkin, Coastal Carolina
George Henson, Winthrop

References

Tournament
Big South Conference men's basketball tournament
Big South Conference men's basketball tournament
Big South Conference men's basketball tournament